Telipna kayonza is a butterfly in the family Lycaenidae. It is found in south-western Uganda.

References

Endemic fauna of Uganda
Butterflies described in 1969
Poritiinae